Alicia Stolle  (born 17 June 1996) is a German female handball player for Ferencvárosi TC and the German national team.

She was part of the team at the 2016 European Women's Handball Championship.

Awards
Nemzeti Bajnokság:
Winner: 2021

Individual awards
 All-Star Right Back of the European Championship: 2018

References

External links

1996 births
Living people
German female handball players
People from Ahlen
Sportspeople from Münster (region)